Sam Sturt (born 12 May 2000) is an Australian rules footballer who plays for the Fremantle Football Club in the Australian Football League (AFL).

Drafted with the 17th selection in the 2018 AFL draft from the Dandenong Stingrays in the TAC Cup, Sturt had mainly played cricket as a junior.  He attended Peninsula Grammar. 

Upon moving to Fremantle, he played for Peel Thunder in the West Australian Football League (WAFL), Fremantle's reserve team, however he missed two months of football after suffering two concussion injuries early in the 2019 season.

Sturt made his AFL debut for Fremantle in the opening round of the 2020 AFL season at Marvel Stadium against Essendon. He earned a Rising Star nomination after kicking three goals and amassing 10 disposals in the match.

Sturt played just one game during the 2021 AFL season after struggling with injuries, and spent the entire 2022 AFL season playing for Peel in the WAFL. Sturt signed a one-year contract extension at the end of the season.

Statistics
Updated to the end of the 2022 season.

|-
| 2019 ||  || 27
| 0 || – || – || – || – || – || – || – || – || – || – || – || – || – || –
|-
| 2020 ||  || 27
| 3 || 4 || 0 || 12 || 11 || 23 || 7 || 3 || 1.3 || 0.0 || 4.0 || 3.7 || 7.7 || 2.3 || 1.0
|-
| 2021 ||  || 1
| 1 || 1 || 1 || 3 || 2 || 5 || 2 || 0 || 1.0 || 1.0 || 3.0 || 2.0 || 5.0 || 2.0 || 0.0
|-
| 2022 ||  || 1
| 0 || – || – || – || – || – || – || – || – || – || – || – || – || – || –
|- class=sortbottom
! colspan=3 | Career
! 4 !! 5 !! 1 !! 15 !! 13 !! 28 !! 9 !! 3 !! 1.3 !! 0.3 !! 3.8 !! 3.3 !! 7.0 !! 2.3 !! 0.8
|}

Notes

Honours and achievements
Individual
 AFL Rising Star nominee: 2020 (round 1)

References

External links

WAFL Player Profile and Statistics

2000 births
Living people
Fremantle Football Club players
Peel Thunder Football Club players
Australian rules footballers from Victoria (Australia)
Dandenong Stingrays players